The 2019 Challenger Banque Nationale de Drummondville was a professional tennis tournament played on indoor hard courts. It was the 13th edition of the tournament and part of the 2019 ATP Challenger Tour. It took place in Drummondville, Canada between March 11 and March 17, 2019.

Singles main-draw entrants

Seeds

1 Rankings are as of March 4, 2019.

Other entrants
The following players received wildcards into the singles main draw:
 Taha Baadi
 Liam Draxl
 Pavel Krainik
 Joshua Peck
 John-Patrick Smith

The following players received entry into the singles main draw as alternates:
  André Göransson
  Yannick Mertens

The following players received entry into the singles main draw using their ITF World Tennis Ranking:
  Gijs Brouwer
  Matías Franco Descotte
  Evan Furness
  Jelle Sels

The following players received entry from the qualifying draw:
  Manuel Guinard
  Skander Mansouri

Champions

Singles

 Ričardas Berankis def.  Yannick Maden 6–3, 7–5.

Doubles

 Scott Clayton /  Adil Shamasdin def.  Matt Reid /  John-Patrick Smith 7–5, 3–6, [10–5].

References

External links
Official website

2019 ATP Challenger Tour
2019
2019 in Canadian tennis
March 2019 sports events in Canada